Emirates Future International Academy (EFIA) is a  school in Abu Dhabi, United Arab Emirates. The school is affiliated to the Central Board of Secondary Education of India. EFIA was established in 2008. EFIA is a sister concern of The Wisdom High School and Al Maali Private School. The School had opened after the closing of The Wisdom High School. The School has 2900 students and 160 teachers approximately.
One of their alumni “Mohammed Yusuf” is currently doing medicine studies in Wroclaw Medical University

History

 
EFIA started in the year 2008 with 869 students and 53 teachers; but now, it has 2900 students. It is known for its cultural activities and sport programs: “EFL” (EFIA FOOTBALL LEAGUE), EXPO EFIA, Cultural fest, “EPL” (EFIA PREMIER LEAGUE), etc.

References

External links

EFIA homepage

Schools in the Emirate of Abu Dhabi
International schools in the United Arab Emirates
2008 establishments in the United Arab Emirates